Weasenham St Peter is a village and civil parish in the English county of Norfolk.
For the purposes of local government, it falls within the district of Breckland.

The village's name means 'Weosa's homestead or village'.

Notes

External links

Villages in Norfolk
Civil parishes in Norfolk
Breckland District